Scabiosa  is a genus in the honeysuckle family (Caprifoliaceae) of flowering plants.  Many of the species in this genus have common names that include the word scabious, but some plants commonly known as scabious are currently classified in related genera such as Knautia and Succisa; at least some of these were formerly placed in Scabiosa.  Another common name for members of this genus is pincushion flowers.

Etymology
The common name 'scabious' comes the Latin word scabiosus meaning 'mangy, rough or itchy' which refers to the herb's traditional usage as a folk medicine to treat scabies, an illness that causes a severe itching sensation.

Description
Some species of Scabiosa are annuals, others perennials. Some are herbaceous plants; others have woody rootstocks. The leaves of most species are somewhat hairy and partly divided into lobes, but a few are smooth and some species have simple leaves. The flowers are borne on inflorescences in the form of heads; each head contains many small florets, each floret cupped in a membranous, saucer-shaped bract. The calyx has five sepals in the form of awns almost as long as the petals. After the flowers have dropped, the calyces together with the bracts form a spiky ball that may be the reason for the "pincushion" common name. The calyx is persistent and remains as a crown on the fruit after it is shed. The corolla has four to five lobes fringing a narrow funnel with a furry throat, the funnel being somewhat longer than the lobes. The florets have four stamens each, set high in the tube, and sticking out. Each fruit has just one seed.

In a few species the heads are sessile but in most species they are borne singly on a tall peduncle.

Scabiosa species and varieties differ in the colours of their flowers, but most are soft lavender blue, lilac or creamy white.

Taxonomy

It was first published in Species Plantarum on page 98 in 1753.

Species
As accepted by Plants of the World Online;

 Scabiosa adzharica 
 Scabiosa africana 
 Scabiosa albanensis 
 Scabiosa amoena 
 Scabiosa andryifolia 
 Scabiosa angustiloba 
 Scabiosa arenaria 
 Scabiosa atropurpurea 
 Scabiosa austroafricana 
 Scabiosa balcanica   
 Scabiosa × beauverdiana 
 Scabiosa bipinnata 
 Scabiosa buekiana 
 Scabiosa canescens 
 Scabiosa cartenniana 
 Scabiosa cephalarioides 
 Scabiosa cinerea 
 Scabiosa colchica 
 Scabiosa columbaria 
 Scabiosa comosa 
 Scabiosa correvoniana 
 Scabiosa corsica 
 Scabiosa crinita 
 Scabiosa daucoides 
 Scabiosa drakensbergensis 
 Scabiosa eremophila 
 Scabiosa farinosa 
 Scabiosa fumarioides 
 Scabiosa galianoi 
 Scabiosa holosericea 
 Scabiosa imeretica 
 Scabiosa incisa 
 Scabiosa ispartaca 
 Scabiosa japonica 
 Scabiosa jezoensis 
 Scabiosa lacerifolia 
 Scabiosa lachnophylla 
 Scabiosa libyca 
 Scabiosa lucida 
 Scabiosa × lucidula 
 Scabiosa mollissima 
 Scabiosa nitens 
 Scabiosa ochroleuca 
 Scabiosa owerinii 
 Scabiosa paphlagonica 
 Scabiosa parielii  
 Scabiosa parviflora 
 Scabiosa praemontana 
 Scabiosa pyrenaica 
 Scabiosa semipapposa 
 Scabiosa silenifolia 
 Scabiosa sirnakia 
 Scabiosa sivrihisarica 
 Scabiosa solymica 
 Scabiosa sosnowskyi 
 Scabiosa taygetea 
 Scabiosa tenuis 
 Scabiosa thysdrusiana 
 Scabiosa transvaalensis 
 Scabiosa triandra 
 Scabiosa triniifolia 
 Scabiosa turolensis 
 Scabiosa tuzluca 
 Scabiosa tysonii 
 Scabiosa velenovskiana 
 Scabiosa vestina 
 Scabiosa webbiana

Distribution
Members of this genus are native to Africa, Europe and Asia.  Some species of Scabiosa, notably small scabious (S. columbaria) and Mediterranean sweet scabious (S. atropurpurea) have been developed into cultivars for gardeners.

In 1782, a mysterious pale yellow scabious, called Scabiosa trenta, was described by Belsazar Hacquet, an Austrian physician, botanist, and mountaineer, in his work Plantae alpinae Carniolicae. It became a great source of inspiration for later botanists and mountaineers discovering the Julian Alps, especially Julius Kugy. The Austrian botanist Anton Kerner von Marilaun later proved Belsazar Hacquet had not found a new species, but a specimen of the already known submediterranean Cephalaria leucantha.

Ecology
Scabious flowers are nectar rich and attractive to many insects including butterflies and moths such as the six-spot burnet. Scabiosa species are food plants for the larvae of some species of Lepidoptera such as the grey pug moth.

References

 
Caprifoliaceae genera
Taxa named by Carl Linnaeus